Dockery may refer to:

Places
 Dockery, Mississippi, a community in the United States
 Dockery, Missouri, a community in the United States
 Dockery Plantation, Mississippi, birthplace of Delta blues music

People with the surname
Alexander Monroe Dockery (1845–1926), American politician from Missouri
Alfred Dockery (1797–1875), American politician from North Carolina
C.C. (Doc) Dockery (born 1933), American businessman and political advisor
Derrick Dockery (born 1980), American football player
Gerald Dockery (born 1970), American football player
John Dockery (born 1944), American sportscaster and American football player
Kevin Dockery (born 1984), American football player
Michelle Dockery (born 1981), British actress
Oliver H. Dockery (1830–1906), American politician from North Carolina
Paula Dockery (born 1961), American politician from Florida
Sam Dockery (1929–2015), American pianist 
Sean Dockery (born 1983), American basketball player
Thomas Pleasant Dockery (1833–1898), American military officer
Will Dockery (1865–1936), American plantation owner

See also
Dockery and Son, a poem in The Whitsun Weddings by Philip Larkin